The 2021–22 Luge World Cup was a multi race tournament over a season for Luge, organised by the FIL. The season started on 20 November 2021 in Yanqing, China, and concluded on 23 January 2022 in St. Moritz, Switzerland.

Calendar

Results

Men's singles

Women's singles

Doubles

Team relay

Standings

Men's singles Overall

Final standings after 12 events
(*Champion 2021)

Men's singles

Final standings after 9 events
(*Champion 2021)

Men's singles Sprint 

Final standings after 3 events
(*Champions 2021)

Women's singles Overall

Final standings after 12 events
(*Champion 2021)

Women's singles

Final standings after 9 events
(*Champion 2021)

Women's singles Sprint 

Final standings after 3 events
(*Champion 2021)

Doubles Overall

Final standings after 12 events
(*Champion 2021)

Doubles

Final standings after 9 events
(*Champion 2021)

Doubles Sprint 

Final standings after 3 events

Team Relay 

Final standings after 6 events
(*Champion 2021)

Medal table

Points

References

External links 

 FIL streaming service

2021-22
2021 in luge
2022 in luge